The Miss Perú 1957 pageant was held on July 6, 1957. Fifteen candidates competed for the national crown. The winner represented Peru at the Miss Universe 1957. The rest of the finalists would enter different pageants.

Placements

Special Awards

 Best Regional Costume - Cuzco - María Luisa Aspiculeta
 Miss Photogenic - Piura - Bertha Scarpatti
 Miss Congeniality - Amazonas - Rosa María Arteaga
 Miss Elegance - Loreto - Gladys Zender

.

Delegates

Amazonas - Rosa María Arteaga
Arequipa - Consuelo Rodríguez
Ayacucho - Bertha Elliot
Callao - Lucy Vargas Figallo
Cuzco - María Luisa Aspiculeta
Distrito Capital - Carmela Berger
Huancavelica - Maruja Vizquerra
Junín - Rena Palacios

La Libertad - Mary Clark 
Lambayeque - Hella Aita
Loreto - Gladys Zender Urbina
Moquegua - Gilda Gugluth
Piura - Bertha Scarpatti
Puno - Carola Cortez
Tacna - Rina Badarracco

References 

Miss Peru
1957 in Peru
1957 beauty pageants